The KH179 ("Korean Howitzer 1 (First) 79") is a South Korean 155 mm 39 caliber towed howitzer designed and developed by the Agency for Defense Development (ADD) for the Republic of Korea Armed Forces, and is now manufactured by Hyundai WIA.

Development
The KH179 is a towed Howitzer developed and produced by Kia Precision Industry (now Hyundai WIA) since 1983 for the purpose of replacing the U.S. M114A2 towed Howitzer and enhancing artillery firepower.

General characteristics
The KH179 makes use of lightweight components (CN79 barrel, RM79 recoil buffer, and CG79 mount) and can be air-transported by CH-47 chinook helicopter and C-130 transport aircraft. In addition, performance improvements were made in range, reliability, and maintenance compared to conventional M114A2 howitzers operated by the South Korean military. The 155 mm ammunition used in the KH179 is compatible with NATO 155 mm standard ammunition, but has significantly improved range and firepower.

It is equipped with a direct/indirect aiming mirror, allowing both direct and indirect howitzer firing. Direct fire uses an L-type aiming mirror with 3.5 magnification and has an effective range of 1,500 m. Indirect shooting uses a four-magnification panoramic aim mirror mounted on the left. The range is 18.1 km for normal rounds, 30 km for rocket-assisted rounds, and the firing rate is 2 rounds per minute for continuous shots, and the maximum firing rate is 4 rounds per minute.

Operational history

Operators

Current operators 

  : 18 for the Indonesian Army, purchased in 2011. Stationed in three batteries in Borneo Island (2), near Malaysian border (2) and one on Sumatra Island.
  : Unknown quantity purchased during Iran–Iraq War. Later copied and produced locally as HM-41.
  : More than 100 in service with the Myanmar Army.
  : 1,000 in service with the Republic of Korea Army and the Republic of Korea Marine Corps.

See also
 HM-41
 KH178 105 mm towed howitzer

References

Howitzers
Artillery of South Korea